Gregory John Brehaut (1 August 1946 – 19 February 1993) was an Australian rules football player and coach who played with the Perth Football Club in the Western Australian National Football League (WANFL) and the Woodville Football Club in the South Australian National Football League (SANFL). Playing mainly as a wingman, he also represented Western Australia in 16 interstate matches, and later coached the East Perth Football Club between 1983 and 1986, before dying in 1993 at the age of 46 from a heart attack. Brehaut was posthumously inducted into the West Australian Football Hall of Fame in 2006.

Football career
Born in Carlisle, Western Australia, Brehaut played with local junior teams before making his senior debut for Perth in 1965, subsequently winning consecutive premierships with the club in 1966, 1967, and 1968. He represented Western Australia several times, and was named in the All-Australian team after the 1969 Australian National Football Carnival, held in Adelaide. Brehaut was named captain-coach of Woodville in the SANFL for the 1974 season, but only managed to play 10 games due to injury, with Woodville finishing last in the league. He returned to Perth in 1975, and retired at the end of that season, finishing his career with 157 games for the club.

After captain-coaching amateur side Wanneroo to four consecutive premierships in the West Australian Football Association (WAFA), Brehaut was appointed coach of East Perth in 1983 and held the position until 1986; however, this was during a period when the club, which in terms of winning percent had been the most successful in the WANFL since 1956, was finding its traditional recruiting base becoming less productive and they played in the finals only once. After seven round in which the Royals had surrendered several large leads, the club board sacked him arguing that he was schooling the club in how to lose matches; however, the crisis, with the Royals' seconds having won five games out of seven, also claimed seconds coach Ian McCulloch, training co-ordinator Bruce Sinclair and reserves manager Gary Gillespie.

Brehaut's appointment had been influenced by the appointment of Mal Atwell, coach for much of his senior career, to the position of club president. Brehaut died in February 1993, after suffering heart attack while jogging on a beach. He was named in Perth's Team of the Century in 1999, and posthumously inducted into the West Australian Football Hall of Fame in 2006.

References

1946 births
1993 deaths
All-Australians (1953–1988)
Australian rules footballers from Perth, Western Australia
East Perth Football Club coaches
Perth Football Club players
West Australian Football Hall of Fame inductees
Woodville Football Club coaches
Woodville Football Club players